This is a list of Northern Iowa Panthers football players in the NFL Draft.

Key

Selections

Notable undrafted players
Note: No drafts held before 1920

References

Northern Iowa

Northern Iowa Panthers NFL Draft